Ramiro Fernando Fassi (born April 21, 1982) is an Argentine footballer. His position is central defender.

Fassi debuted in 2002 playing for Rosario Central, where he grew footballing club. Ángel Tulio Zof coach put him as owner in 2004.

When Néstor Gorosito took the managerial position at Central, Fassi was no longer an option for the team, and left on a one-year loan to Sporting Cristal from Peru, where he became a starter scoring a league goal. In 2009, he signed with Oriente Petrolero for 1 year.

External links
 Profile at BDFA 
 El Colorado Firma pa Oriente 
 Argentine Primera statistics 

1982 births
Living people
Association football defenders
Argentine footballers
Rosario Central footballers
Sporting Cristal footballers
Oriente Petrolero players
San Martín de San Juan footballers
Argentine expatriate footballers
Expatriate footballers in Peru
Expatriate footballers in Bolivia
Argentine expatriate sportspeople in Bolivia
Sportspeople from Santa Fe Province